Arthur W. B. Bourne was an English footballer.

Career
A small winger, Bourne played for Liverpool Road before joining Burslem Port Vale in April 1902. His debut came on 8 September 1902, in a goalless home draw with Preston North End. He was only to play two more games before being released at the end of the season.

Career statistics
Source:

References

1880 births
Year of death missing
People from Sandbach
English footballers
Association football wingers
Port Vale F.C. players
English Football League players